In Mandaeism, a rahma (plural form: rahmia ) is a daily devotional prayer that is recited during a specific time of the day or specific day of the week.

Translations
E. S. Drower's version of the Qolasta, the Canonical Prayerbook of the Mandaeans, has 64 rahma prayers translated into English that are numbered from 106 to 169. In Drower's ordering, the rahma prayers directly follow the Asiet Malkia prayer (CP 105), while the Ṭabahatan prayer (CP 170) comes after the rahma prayers.

Part 1 of the Oxford Collection in Mark Lidzbarski's Mandäische Liturgien (1920) contains 60 rahma prayers translated into German that correspond to prayers 106–160 and 165–169 in Drower (1959).

List of rahma prayers
Below, Oxford refers to Lidzbarski's (1920) numbering, while CP refers to Drower's (1959) number.

Hourly prayers
The first 13 prayers are recited during the three times of the day for prayer, which are dawn (sunrise), noontime (the "seventh hour"), and evening (sunset).

Oxford 1.1 (CP 106): opening prayer
Oxford 1.2 (CP 107): dawn prayer
Oxford 1.3 (CP 108): dawn prayer
Oxford 1.4 (CP 109): noontime (seventh hour) prayer
Oxford 1.5 (CP 110)
Oxford 1.6 (CP 111)
Oxford 1.7 (CP 112): opening evening prayer

Rahma prayers recited after incense is offered:

Oxford 1.8 (CP 113): dawn prayer, after incense
Oxford 1.9 (CP 114): dawn prayer, after incense
Oxford 1.10 (CP 115): dawn prayer, after incense
Oxford 1.11 (CP 116): dawn prayer, after incense
Oxford 1.12 (CP 117): noontime (seventh hour) prayer, after incense
Oxford 1.13 (CP 118): evening prayer, after incense

Prayers for the days of the week
There are 6 rahma prayers for each day of the week. Each set consists of alternating long and short prayers (i.e., the 1st prayer is a long one, the 2nd prayer is a short one, while the 3rd prayer is again a long one, etc.).

Sunday prayers
Oxford 1.14 (CP 119)
Oxford 1.15 (CP 120)
Oxford 1.16 (CP 121)
Oxford 1.17 (CP 122)
Oxford 1.18 (CP 123)
Oxford 1.19 (CP 124)

Monday prayers
Oxford 1.20 (CP 125)
Oxford 1.21 (CP 126)
Oxford 1.22 (CP 127)
Oxford 1.23 (CP 128)
Oxford 1.24 (CP 129)
Oxford 1.25 (CP 130)

Tuesday prayers
Oxford 1.26 (CP 131)
Oxford 1.27 (CP 132)
Oxford 1.28 (CP 133)
Oxford 1.29 (CP 134)
Oxford 1.30 (CP 135)
Oxford 1.31 (CP 136)

Wednesday prayers
Oxford 1.32 (CP 137)
Oxford 1.33 (CP 138)
Oxford 1.34 (CP 139)
Oxford 1.35 (CP 140)
Oxford 1.36 (CP 141)
Oxford 1.37 (CP 142)

Thursday prayers
Oxford 1.38 (CP 143)
Oxford 1.39 (CP 144)
Oxford 1.40 (CP 145)
Oxford 1.41 (CP 146)
Oxford 1.42 (CP 147)
Oxford 1.43 (CP 148)

Friday prayers
Oxford 1.44 (CP 149)
Oxford 1.45 (CP 150)
Oxford 1.46 (CP 151)
Oxford 1.47 (CP 152)
Oxford 1.48 (CP 153)
Oxford 1.49 (CP 154)

Saturday prayers
Oxford 1.50 (CP 155)
Oxford 1.51 (CP 156)
Oxford 1.52 (CP 157)
Oxford 1.53 (CP 158)
Oxford 1.54 (CP 159)
Oxford 1.55 (CP 160)

Saturday evening priest initiation prayers
The 2 prayers for novices in priest initiation ceremonies, recited on Saturday evening (sunset):

CP 161 (not in Lidzbarski)
CP 162 (not in Lidzbarski)

Sunday dawn priest initiation prayers
The 2 prayers for novices in priest initiation ceremonies, recited on Sunday dawn (sunrise):

CP 163 (not in Lidzbarski)
CP 164 (not in Lidzbarski)

"Fruits of Ether" prayers
The last 5 prayers are the prayers for the "Fruit(s) of Ether".

Oxford 1.56 (CP 165)
Oxford 1.57 (CP 166)
Oxford 1.58 (CP 167)
Oxford 1.59 (CP 168)
Oxford 1.60 (CP 169)

See also

Brakha (daily prayer in Mandaeism)
Asiet Malkia
Tabahatan
Qolasta

References

Mandaean prayer
Mandaic words and phrases